The 2017 WEC 6 Hours of Spa-Francorchamps, formally the WEC 6 Heures de Spa-Francorchamps, was an endurance sports car racing event held at the Circuit de Spa-Francorchamps, Stavelot, Belgium on 4–6 May 2017. It was the second race of the 2017 FIA World Endurance Championship, and was the sixth running of the event as part of the championship. The event was won by the #8 Toyota Gazoo Racing Toyota TS050 Hybrid

Qualifying

Qualifying results
Pole position winners in each class are marked in bold.

Race

Race result
The minimum number of laps for classification (70% of the overall winning car's race distance) was 122 laps. Class winners in bold.

Standings after the race

2017 LMP FIA World Endurance Drivers Championship standings

2017 LMP1 FIA World Endurance Manufacturers Championship standings

 Note: Only the top five positions are included for the Drivers' Championship standings.

2017 GT FIA World Endurance Drivers Championship standings

2017 GT FIA World Endurance Manufacturers Championship standings

 Note: Only the top five positions are included for the Drivers' Championship standings.

Notes

References

External links 
 

Spa-Francorchamps
Spa-Francorchamps
6 Hours of Spa-Francorchamps
6 Hours of Spa-Francorchamps